Luke Andrew Munns (born 20 September 1980) is an Australian musician and the original drummer of Hillsong United, one of several worship bands to come out of Sydney's Hillsong Church's youth group. Munns is also a recording producer and songwriter. Munns was a member of Hillsong United from 1999 to 2006 but left to start the rock/indie/folk band LUKAS (later renamed to thelukasband) as lead singer/songwriter. He is a member of Hillsong Church, Australia. Munns was also the drummer for many Hillsong Church albums, and the band Able, which was composed of Marty Sampson, Michael Guy Chislett and Joel Houston, which won the Channel V Leg Up competition in 2001.

Biography

Early life 
Munns began playing piano, and wrote his first song at the young age of three years, and focused his efforts to playing drums and guitar from the age of seven. He is the oldest of four brothers.

Able 
Munns joined the Hillsong youth band at age 13. At the same time as this, Munns met with fellow Hillsong United members bass player Joel Houston, guitarist and vocalist Marty Sampson and younger member Michael Guy Chislett. The band went through a name change from Consecrated to Able and in 2001, the band was selected by Channel V as its Leg Up competition winners. With the winnings from this competition, Able put together The Able EP at a recording studio in Byron Bay, but shortly after releasing the EP in 2004, the band broke up and instead put their efforts into Hillsong United.

Hillsong United 
Munns' debut with the Hillsong United as their live recording drummer was in 1998; he played drums on seven live recordings until 2007 when he left to frontman the band LUKAS. As part of Hillsong United music team, Munns has toured in North America, South America, Africa, Europe and Asia. He has contributed to seven of the main Hillsong album recordings, by worship pastor Darlene Zschech. Songs he has written are sung in churches worldwide and have been translated into 32 languages, including Korean and German. He has helped write and produce many Hillsong songs including "Stay" on By Your Side (1999) and "Pour Out Your Spirit" on Best Friend (2000).

In 2002 Munns designed the official UNITED logo which is still currently in use today and also designed the album artwork for Best Friend (2000), To the Ends of the Earth (2002) and More Than Life (2004).

Hillsong Kids 
Munns has been nominated for two GMA Dove Awards for Children's Music Album of the Year for his music production work on Crazy Noise (2013), and Jesus Is My Super Hero (2006).

LUKAS 

In 2004 Munns started the indie/folk band LUKAS and recorded six songs in his home studio. Since then the LUKAS Demo EP has had over 400,000 downloads worldwide. He then toured around Australia on a support solo tour with Australian/NZ folk artist Brooke Fraser and then went back into the studio to record the You & Me EP with producer Brendan Anthony (INXS, Midnight Oil, Jimmy Barnes, Brianna Carpenter (Australian Idol) in Studios 301, Sydney.

In 2006 LUKAS transitioned into a worship and musician training movement, releasing the singles "Shine Your Glory" and "Lost at Sea".

The single's Abandoned featuring Australian electronic music producer and DJ Northie (2013), For God So Loved (2014), Heaven On The Earth (2014), all debuted at number one on iTunes Inspirational Charts, Australia, and Beauty For Ashes reached number five.

Pastor Darlene Zschech commissioned Munns to write, record and release "For God So Loved" (2014) for Easter for their church HopeUC, based on the Central Coast, Australia. For God So Loved debuted at number one on the Australian Inspirational iTunes charts.

LUKAS have toured in Australia, New Zealand, United States, Canada and Singapore, mainly holding worship encounter nights and church team training sessions, and have main staged Blackstump Festival, Big Exo Day, Parachute Festival and Hillsong Conference. They also performed Feels Like Home on MTV for the NOKIA Be Heard competition and placed 2nd out of all unsigned bands in Australia.

Many past LUKAS members have gone on to become part of the main Hillsong Worship band and Hillsong United teams including Paul Mabury (drums), Harrison Wood (drums), Simon Kobler (drums) and Matt Hann (bass guitar).

Former guitarist Christopher Whitehall left the band in 2006 to frontman the indie pop band The Griswolds.

24 January 2015, LUKAS recorded a worship session at The Grove Studios, set for release late 2015, filmed and directed by cinematographer Paul Moss. Released online on 28 November 2015.

Munns has been signed to Hillsong/Shout Publishing from 1998 until present.

Discography 
Hillsong Albums on which Munns has performed:

 By Your Side (1999)
 Everyday (1999)
 For This Cause (2000)
 Best Friend (2000)
 You Are My World (2001)
 King of Majesty (2001)
 Blessed (2002)
 To the Ends of the Earth (2002)
 Hope (2003)
 More Than Life (2004)
 Hillsong/Delirious? UP: Unified Praise (2004)
 For All You've Done (2004)
 Look to You (2005)

Recent appearances:
 LUKAS - You & Me EP (2007)
 Mia Fieldes - There's A Reason (2007)
 Mia Fieldes - Minus The Walls (2008)
 GMF  - Ride of Life (2008)
 Awakening '09 Conference intro music (2009)
 Hillsong - Colour Your World Women's Conference '09 promotional music (2009)
 Lukas - Shine Your Glory Single (2009)
 Everywoman Promo - Jack Diaz (2009)
 C3 - Send Down Your Love (2010)
 Presence Conference - Promo (2010)
 Hillsong - A Beautiful Exchange (2010)
 RICE Revolution Conference (2010)
 C3 - Undivided (2010)
 Loveis Album (2010)
 Abandoned Single Ft. Northie (2013)
 "LUKAS - Live At The Grove Film & EP" (2015)

References

External links 
 Link to Official LUKE MUNNS Website
 Link to Official thelukasband Website
 Fresh 103.2FM Lukas EP Review
 Fresh 103.2 Fresh 103.2FM Artist of the Month

1980 births
Australian Pentecostals
Australian songwriters
Christian music songwriters
Hillsong musicians
Living people
Australian performers of Christian music